WBGU (88.1 FM) is an American non-commercial, college radio station licensed to serve Bowling Green, Ohio, United States.  The station, established in 1951, is owned and operated by Bowling Green State University.

WBGU broadcasts a college radio format from the campus of Bowling Green State University. WBGU is a student-run radio station that focuses on independent, underground, and under-represented music.

History
WBGU's origins begin with a public address system built to broadcast a Bowling Green basketball game with audio phoned in from New York City in December 1947. This led to a carrier current station known as "WRSM" signing on in January 1948 at 600 kHz. This station, run by students and volunteers, was authorized by the Federal Communications Commission (FCC) and was affiliated with the Intercollegiate Broadcasting System. Repeated expansion led the university in 1951 to apply to the FCC for a construction permit to build an FM broadcasting station, licensed as "WBGU" in November 1951, with 10 watts of effective radiated power on a frequency of 88.1 MHz. In the six decades since it launched, the station has upgraded its signal strength, studio facilities, and equipment to meet the needs of the campus and the surrounding area.

WBGU is also the flagship home for Bowling Green hockey with play-by-play voice Ryan Vallon.

References

External links

WFAL official site
Local newspaper article
Newspaper article
Telecomm Department
Balcerzak, Andrew, Kyle Gebhart, and Stephen Merrill. "WBGU 88.1 FM - Broadcasting from Bowling Green, Ohio." Ed. Dara Greene and Ryan Glover. BGSU. 9 July 2009.

BGU-FM
BGU
Bowling Green State University
Radio stations established in 1951
Wood County, Ohio
1951 establishments in Ohio